Marina Maksimovna Fedorova (born 10 May 1997) is a Russian beach soccer and footballer who currently plays for Lokomotiv Moscow in the Russian Women's Football Championship. She has previously played for the Russian side FC Zorky and NiceFutis in the Finnish women's premier division Naisten Liiga.

Fedorova made her debut for the Russia women's national football team in October 2015 against Germany.

Awards

Beach soccer
 Women's Euro Beach Soccer Cup
 Winner (2): 2018, 2019

Individual
 Women's Euro Beach Soccer Cup (MVP) (2): 2018, 2019
 Women's Euro Beach Soccer Cup (Top Scorer) (1): 2019
 2018 Best Women's Player
 Top Scorer of the 2016 Women's Euro Winners Cup

Personal life 
Fedorova is married to Nurasyl Akhoub-Fedorov. They have 1 child.

References

External links
Marina Fedorova, profile at Beach Soccer Russia (in Russian)

1997 births
Living people
Sportspeople from Sevastopol
Women's association football forwards
Russian women's footballers
Russia women's international footballers
Universiade bronze medalists for Russia
Universiade medalists in football
FC Zorky Krasnogorsk (women) players
NiceFutis players
Primera División (women) players
Real Betis Féminas players
Russian expatriate footballers
Russian expatriate sportspeople in Finland
Expatriate women's footballers in Finland
Russian expatriate sportspeople in Spain
Expatriate women's footballers in Spain
Russian beach soccer players
Ryazan-VDV players
WFC Lokomotiv Moscow players
Russian Women's Football Championship players
UEFA Women's Euro 2017 players